

Events

Year overall
 The AOL name was finally dropped from Time Warner, which reverted to the Time Warner name.
 Peter van Straaten wins his third Inktspotprijs for Best Political Cartoon.

March
 March 16: The final Sunday comic episode of Flash Gordon is published, which also marks the end of the series overall, which had been in continuous production since 1934.

April 
 Action Comics #800: Double-sized anniversary issue, "A Hero's Journey," by Joe Kelly, Pascual Ferry, and Duncan Rouleau. (DC Comics)
 April 19: Webcomic Bigtime Consulting comes to a conclusion

June
 Wolverine vol. 2 is canceled by Marvel with issue #189.
 June 10 - Manhwa Dragon Hunter begins publication
 The first episode of Fabio Ciccone's webcomic Magias & Barbaridades is published.

July
 July 18: The first issue of the Croatian comics magazine Q strip is published. It will last until 2013.

September
 September 24: Albert Uderzo is honoured as Commandeur des Arts et Lettres.

October
 October 18-19: During the Stripdagen in Alphen aan den Rijn John Reid, Bastiaan Geleijnse and Jean-Marc van Tol receive the Stripschapprijs.   Gerard Roord, publisher of Illustrated Classics wins the Hans P. Frankfurtherprijs.  Henk Sprenger, Wim Meuldijk and Gerrit Stapel are the first people to receive a new award, the Bulletje en Boonestaakschaal.

December
 December 16: In Topolino the first episode of The Lost Explorers' Trail, by Casty and Giorgio Cavazzano is published. It marks the debut of Eurasia Toft, a Disney version of Lara Croft.
December 24: The final issue of the Flemish comics magazine Suske en Wiske Weekblad is published.

Deaths

January
 January 1: Warren Whipple, American comics artist (continued There Oughta Be a Law!), dies at age 92. 
 January 2: Jack Keller, American comics artist (Kid Colt) dies at age 80.
 January 8: Franz Drappier, aka Franz, Belgian comics artist (Hypérion, Lester Cockney, Thomas Noland, continued Jugurtha and Jerry Spring), dies at age 54.
 January 10: Ramón Sabatés, Spanish comics artist (Casimiro Noteví, Agente tel TBI, worked on Los Grandes Inventos de TBO), dies at age 87.
 January 14: Rémy Bordelet, French comics artist (continued Big Bill le Casseur), dies at age 71. 
 January 20: Mose, French comics artist (Zano, Roméo), dies at age 85. 
 January 28: Leoncio Rojas Cruzat, aka Leo, Chilean comics artist (Macabeo, Castañita, Hurgando el Deporte, Pasionario, Contrafuegos, Solterina), dies at age 83.
 January 30: Guido Zamperoni, aka Guy Zam, Italian comics artist, dies at age 90.

February
 February 26: 
 Carlos Freixas, Spanish comics artist (Pistol Jim, Darío Malbrán Psicoanalista, Elmer King, Tucho, de Canilla a Campeón), dies at age 79.
 Ram Waeerkar, Indian comic artist (Amar Chitra Katha, Suppandi, Nasruddin Hodja, Pyarela), dies at age 66 or 67. 
 February 28: Pete Millar, American comics artist (Drag Cartoons, co-creator of CARtoons Magazine), dies at age 73.

March 
 March 2: Bill Woggon, American comics artist (Katy Keene), dies at age 92.
 March 3: Dave Pascal, American cartoonist and comics artist (The New Yorker), dies at age 84.
 March 11: Frans Verstreken, Belgian publisher, writer and curator (organized the annual Salon van de Vlaamse Humor (Salon of Flemish Comedy) exhibition highlighting work by Flemish cartoonists), dies at age 80.  
 March 12: 
 Branco Karabajic, Croatian comics artist and animator (Rolf Kauka comics, Pauli, Familie Mausbein), dies at age 77.
 Thomas Warkentin, American animator, comics writer (continued Flash Gordon) and comic artist (Star Trek newspaper comic), dies at age 67. 
 March 22: Fernando Carpucino, Italian painter, illustrator and comics artist, dies at the age of 80.

April 
 April 3: Karel Boumans, aka Kabou, Belgian comics artist (De Avonturen van Olivier, Bert Crak, Roel Harding, Studio Vandersteen, continued De Lustige Kapoentjes), dies at age 71.
 April 4: Rudy Florese, Filipino comic artist, dies at age 56. 
 April 9: Jerry Bittle, American comics artist (Geech, Shirley and Son), dies at age 53.
 April 14: Ric Hugo, American comics artist (Soliloquy), dies at age 75 or 76.
 April 14: John Kent, New Zealand cartoonist and comics artist (Varoomshka), passes away at age 65.

May 
 May 2: Peter Jackson, British comics artist (London Is Stranger Than Fiction), dies at age 81. 
 May 8: Leo Bachle, Canadian comics artist (Johnny Canuck), dies at age 79. 
 May 14: Dante Quinterno, Argentine cartoonist and comics artist, (Patoruzú, Isidoro Cañones), dies at age 93.
 May 23: Pierce Rice, American comics artist (worked for Harvey Comics), dies at age 86 or 87.
 May 27: Al Hartley, American comics artist (Archie Comics, Christian comics), dies at age 81.

June 
 June 4: Serafín Rojo Caamaño, Spanish comic artist (Doña Tere, Don Panchito y su Hijo Teresito, El Astronauta Saturnino Chiquiflauta, Tip y Coll, Doña Paca Cotilla, Pintador Talí), dies at age 77. 
 June 9: Georges Pichard, French comics artist and writer  (Ténébrax, Submerman, Blanche Epiphanie, Paulette).
 June 18: Guy Bara, French cartoonist and comic artist (Max L'Explorateur, Kéké Le Perroquet, Cro-Magnon), passes away at age 79.

July 
 July 17: Cosper, Danish comics artist (Morkelige Mr. Mox, Alfredo), dies at age 92. 
 July 20: William Woolfolk, American novelist, TV writer and comics writer (worked for DC Comics, Marvel Comics, Archie Comics, Fawcett Comics, Quality Comics, Police Comics, Timely Comics), dies at age 86.
 July 24: Warren Kremer, American comics artist (Harvey Comics), passes away at age 82.
 July 31: Guido Crepax, Italian comics artist (Valentina), dies at age 70.

August
 August 9: Bert Wunderink, Dutch comics artist (Bram en Sijm en de Bende van Zwarte Dolf), dies at age 80.
 August 31: Dave Gerard, American comics artist (Citizen Smith, Will-Yum), dies at age 94.

September
 September 25: Herb Gardner, American playwright, screenwriter and comics artist (The Nebbishes), passes away at age 68 from lung disease.

October
 October 1: Costas Grammatopoulos, Greek painter, engraver, illustrator, poster designer and comics artist (worked on Classics Illustrated), dies at age 87.
 October 5: Alain Bignon, French comic artist, dies at age 56. 
 October 12: Pete Morisi, American comics artist (Thunderbolts), dies at age 75.
 October 14: Ned Riddle, American cartoonist and comics artist (Mr. Tweedy), dies at age 90 and 91.

November
 November 12: John Tartaglione, American comics artist and inker (Marvel Comics, made comics biographies about John F. Kennedy, Lyndon B. Johnson, Pope John Paul II and Mother Teresa), dies at age 82.
 November 29: Len Lawson, Australian comics artist (The Lone Avenger, The Hooded Rider, Diana, Queen of the Apes) and convicted rapist and murderer, dies at the age of 76 from a heart attack in his cell.
 November 30: Kin Platt, American caricaturist, radio writer, TV writer, animation writer, comics artist (Mr. and Mrs., Supermouse), dies at age 91.

December
 December 5: Bob Gregory, American comics writer/artist (Donald Duck comics, Hanna-Barbera comics) dies at age 82.
 December 20: 
 Edgar Ley, Chinese-born, Belgian comics artist (Frank, various historical comics), dies at age 85 or 86. 
 Hector Saavedra, Argentine comics artist (Disney comics, Looney Tunes comics), passes away at age 49 or 50.
 December 25: Art Wetherell, British illustrator and comics artist, dies at age 42. 
 December 27: Pete Alvarado, American animator and comics artist (Disney comics, Warner Bros. comics, Hanna-Barbera comics), dies at age 83.
 December 29: Don Lawrence, British comics artist, (Storm), dies at age 75.
 Specific date in December unknown: Oliver Passingham, British comics artist and animator (Leslie Shane, Jane Fortune, Rick Martin, Sally Marsh, Zoe Fair, Rick Random), dies at age 78.

Specific date unknown
 Allan Borgström, Swedish comics artist (Phili Philin), dies at age 89 or 90. 
 Antonio Correa Expósito, Spanish comics artist, dies at age 62 or 63.

Exhibitions 
 Summer–early Fall: "Ohio Cartoonists: A Bicentennial Celebration" (Ohio State University) — includes work by Frederick Burr Opper, Edwina Dumm, Richard F. Outcault, and many of the cartoonists who took Charles N. Landon's Cleveland-based correspondence course and were hired by Landon to create cartoon features for the Newspaper Enterprise Association
 Oct 19, 2003-Sep 7, 2004: "Heroes, Heartthrobs and Horrors: Celebrating Connecticut’s Invention of the Comic Book" (Connecticut Historical Society, Hartford, Connecticut) — exhibits on Eastern Color Printing and Funnies on Parade

Conventions 
 January 11: FLUKE Mini-Comics & Zine Festival (Tasty World, Athens, Georgia)
 January 25: Big Apple Comic Book Art, and Toy Show I (St. Paul's Church Auditorium, New York City)
 January 31–February 2: Creation Comic Book & Pop Culture Convention (Pasadena, California)
 February 1–2: Alternative Press Expo (Concourse Exhibition Center, San Francisco)
 February 9: Emerald City ComiCon (Qwest Field, West Field Plaza, Seattle, Washington) — first annual event; 2,500 attendees; guests: Erik Larsen, John Cassaday, Scott Morse, Pia Guerra, Darick Robertson, Sean Chen, Greg Rucka, Ford Gilmore, Jim Mahfood, Steve Skroce, Mike Huddleston, Steve Rolston, Ian Boothby, Jay Faerber, Matt Haley, Kathleen Webb, John Lustig, David Hahn, Stefano Gaudiano, Donna Barr, Roberta Gregory, Rick Hoberg, Jason Hall, and Brian Snöddy
 February 28–March 2: MegaCon (Orange County Convention Center, Orlando, Florida) — guests include J. Scott Campbell, Scott McDaniel, Chuck Dixon, Frank Cho, George Pérez, Roy Thomas, Greg Land, Jimmy Palmiotti, Amanda Conner, Robert Rodi, Bart Sears, Brian Pulido, and Adam Hughes
 March 22–24: East Coast Hobby Show 2003 (Ft. Washington Expo Center, Philadelphia, Pennsylvania)
 March 23: Toronto Comic Con I (Toronto Hilton Hotel, Toronto, Ontario, Canada) — first edition of this convention
 March 29–30: Planet Comicon (Overland Park International Trade Center, Overland Park, Kansas)
 April: Phoenix Comicon (Glendale, Arizona)
 April 5–6: Dallas Comic Con 2.0 (Richardson Civic Center, Plano, Texas) — guests include Tim Bradstreet, Adam Hughes, Dave Dorman, and Frank Cho, Scott Kurtz, Kerry Gammill, Cal Slayton, and Michael Lark. A collectible program book produced with dual covers by artists Dave Dorman and Adam Hughes.
 April 5: Small Press and Alternative Comics Expo (S.P.A.C.E.) (Ohio Expo Center, Rhodes Center, Columbus, Ohio) — special guests: Dave Sim and Gerhard
 April 25–27: Pittsburgh Comicon (Pittsburgh Expomart, Monroeville, Pennsylvania) — guests include Terry Austin, Terry Moore, Wayne Wise, Adam Hughes, Bill Morrison, Erin Gray, George Pérez, Joseph Michael Linsner, Jim Balent, and Michael Turner
 April 26–27: WonderCon (Moscone Center, San Francisco, California) — convention moves from Oakland
 April 27: MicroCon 2003 (Maplewood Community Center, Maplewood, Minnesota)
 May 2–3: Big Apple Comic Book Art, and Toy Show II (St. Paul's Church Auditorium, New York City) — guest of honor Jim Steranko; other guests: Russ Heath, Billy Tucci, Graig Weich, Tony Isabella, Guy Gilchrist, Jim Krueger, Jamal Igle, Robin Riggs, and Jim Salicrup
 May 2–3: Hershey Comicon I (Cocoaplex Cinema, Hershey, Pennsylvania)
 May 16–18: Motor City Comic Con I (Novi Expo Center, Novi, Michigan) — guests include Aaron Bordner, Mark Bode, Dan Brereton, Norm Breyfogle, Guy Davis, Dan Fogel, Frank Kelly Freas, Laura Freas, Gilbert Hernandez, Jaime Hernandez, Vince Locke, William Messner Loebs, James O'Barr, Jim Pitts, Paul Ryan, William Stout, Billy Tucci, Neil Vokes, and Larry Welz
 May 17: East Coast Black Age of Comics Convention (Philadelphia, Pennsylvania) — 50 attendees; guests include William H. Foster III, Jerry Craft, and Anthony Jappa
 May 23–24: Comics 2003 (Bristol, Avon, England, U.K.) — presentation of the National Comics Awards; guests include Jim Lee, Jeff Smith, Dez Skinn, Mike Conroy, Duncan Fegredo, Steve Yeowell, Gary Spencer Millidge, Phil Winslade, Sean Phillips, Mike Carey, Chris Weston, Chris Francis, Phil Hall, Bryan Talbot, Dave Gibbons, John McCrea, John Cassaday, D'Israeli, Staz Johnson, Gary Erskine, Rich Johnston, Nick Locking, and David Hitchcock
 May 30–June 1: Wizard World East (Pennsylvania Convention Center, Philadelphia, Pennsylvania)
 May 31–June 1: Adventure Con 2 (Knoxville Expo Center, Knoxville, Tennessee)
 June: Comica — London International Comics Festival (Institute of Contemporary Arts, London, UK) — first iteration of this event, organized by Paul Gravett; guests include Chris Ware, Charles Burns, Joe Sacco, Warren Ellis, Mike Carey, Posy Simmonds, Sophie Crumb, David Lloyd, Melinda Gebbie, Peter Hogan, Garry Leach, and Gary Spencer Millidge
 June 13–15: Heroes Convention (Charlotte Convention Center, Charlotte, North Carolina) — guests include Bob Almond, Jim Amash, Pat Broderick, Frank Brunner, Sal Buscema, Nick Cardy, Richard Case, Steve Conley, Shane Davis, Kim DeMulder, Todd Dezago, Tommy Lee Edwards, Michael Eury, Tom Feister, Lou Ferrigno, Dick Giordano, Cully Hamner, Scott Hampton, Tony Harris, Irwin Hasen, Adam Hughes, Matt Hughes, Greg Hyland, Jamal Igle, Dan Jolley, Bruce Jones, Nat Jones, Jason Latour, Bob Layton, Jon Lewis, David W. Mack, Pop Mhan, Phil Noto, Jeff Parker, George Pratt, Budd Root, Craig Rousseau, Julie Schwartz, Bill Sienkiewicz, Roxanne Starr, Brian Stelfreeze, Karl Story, Roy Thomas, Rich Tommaso, Tim Townsend, Koi Turnbull, George Tuska, Neil Vokes, Loston Wallace, Daniel Way, and Mike Wieringo
 June 13–14: Lexington Sci-Fi Comic Con (Lexington Convention Center, Lexington, Kentucky)
 June 20–21: Hershey Comicon II (Cocoaplex Cinema, Hershey, Pennsylvania)
 June 22: MoCCA Festival (Puck Building, New York City) — guests include Jessica Abel, Signe Baumane, Amanda Conner, Howard Cruse, Evan Dorkin, Phoebe Gloeckner, Klaus Janson, Denis Kitchen, James Kochalka, Peter Kuper, Jason Little, Patrick McDonnell, Mike Mignola, Bill Plympton, Ted Rall, Jeff Smith, Art Spiegelman, and Craig Thompson
 July 12–13: Big-D Collectible Show (Hampton Inn Military Pkwy & Hwy 635 Mesquite, Dallas, Texas) — 1500 attendees
 July 17–20: Comic-Con International (San Diego Convention Center, San Diego, California) — 70,000 attendees; official guests: Brian Azzarello, Charles Berberian, Sal Buscema, Philippe Dupuy, Neil Gaiman, Jackson "Butch" Guice, Nalo Hopkinson, Steve Jackson, Geoff Johns, Larry Lieber, Carla Speed McNeil, Kevin O'Neill, Howard Post, and R.A. Salvatore
 July 18–20: Hawaii All-Collectors Show (Neal Blaisdell Exhibition Hall, Honolulu, Hawaii)
 August: "Cyber CAPTION" (Oxford Union Society, Oxford, England) — guests include Carla Speed McNeil
 August 3: Atlanta Comic Convention (Atlanta Marriott Century Center, Atlanta, Georgia)
 August 8–10: Wizard World Chicago (Rosemont Convention Center, Rosemont, Illinois)
 August 22–24: Fan Expo Canada (Metro Toronto Convention Centre, Toronto, Ontario, Canada) — 20,655 attendees; guests include Leonard Nimoy, Ray Park, Adrian Rayment & Neil Rayment Twins (The Matrix), J. August Richards, Connor Trinneer, Denise Crosby, Brian Michael Bendis, Francisco Herrera, Ed McGuinness, Ken Steacy, Darwyn Cooke, Josh Blaylock, and Fred Gallagher
 August 29–September 1: Dragon Con (Hyatt Regency Atlanta/Marriott Marquis, Atlanta, Georgia) — 20,000+ attendees
 September 5–6: Big Apple Comic Book Art, and Toy Show III (St. Paul's Church Auditorium, New York City)
 September 5–7: Small Press Expo (Holiday Inn Select, Bethesda, Maryland)
 September 12–14: Raptus 2003 (Bergen Konferanse Senter, Skandic Hotel Bergen, Bergen, Norway) — 4,500 attendees
 September 20–21: Baltimore Comic-Con (Baltimore Convention Center, Baltimore, Maryland)
 September 20–21: Royalfest 2003 (Gateway Center, Collinsville, Illinois) — 3,000–4,000 attendees
 October 3–5: Adventure Con 2.5 (Gatlinburg Convention Center, Gatlinburg, Tennessee)
 October 4–5: FallCon (Education Building at the Minnesota State Fairgrounds, St. Paul, Minnesota)
 October 17–November 2: FIBDA XIV (Amadora, Portugal)
 October 18–19: Motor City Comic Con II (Novi Expo Center, Novi, Michigan) — guests include Kurt Busiek, Andy Lee, and David W. Mack
 October 19: Los Angeles Comic Book and Science Fiction Convention (Shrine Auditorium Expo Center, Los Angeles, California)
 October 19: Maine Comic Book Spectacular (Verrillo's Convention Center, Portland, Maine)
 October 25–26: Dallas Comic Con ("DCC3") (Plano Centre, Plano, Texas) — guests include Tim Bradstreet, Phil Noto, Adam Hughes, Scott Kurtz, John Lucas, Ben Dunn, Jaime Mendoza, Cal Slayton, and Erik Reeves
 October 31–November 3: Las Vegas Comic-Con (Mandalay Bay Convention Center, Las Vegas, Nevada) — first annual event
 October 31–November 2: Lucca Comics and Games (Fair Point, Lucca, Tuscany, Italy) — 50,000 attendees
 November 1: Comic Festival Winter Special (Holiday Inn, Bloomsbury, London, England, U.K.) — guests include Steven Appleby, Mark Buckingham, John M. Burns, Laurence Campbell, Al Davison, Alex Collier, Mike Conroy, Andy Diggle, Simon Donald, Christian Dunn, Ian Edginton, Carl Flint, Paul Gambaccini, Phil Gascoigne, Ian Gibson, Jon Haward, Morris Heggie, P. J. Holden, Jock, Davey Jones, Euan Kerr, Roger Langridge, Metaphrog, Gary Spencer Millidge, Robbie Morrison, Paul Palmer, Siku, Dez Skinn, Kev F. Sutherland, and Lee Townsend
 November 6–9: Coco Bulles (Culture Palace of Abidjan, Côte d'Ivoire)
 November 7–9: Toronto Comic Con II (National Trade Centre, Queen Elizabeth Building, Toronto, Ontario, Canada) — guests of honor: Jim Starlin and Michael William Kaluta
 November 15–16: Kansas City ComiCon (Shawnee Civic Center, Shawnee, Kansas)
 November 21–23: Wizard World Texas (Arlington Convention Center, Arlington, Texas)
 November 28–30: Big Apple Comic Book Art, and Toy Show IV (Metropolitan Pavilion, New York City)
 November 29–30: Mid-Ohio Con (Hilton Columbus Hotel at Easton Town Center, Columbus, Ohio)
 December 7: Boston Comic Book Spectacular (Boston Radisson Hotel, Amesbury, Massachusetts) — 1,000 attendees

First issues by title
Confidential Assassination Troop
Release: by Tong Li Comics. Writer & Artist: Fung Chin Pang
Fluffy
Release: by Jonathan Cape. Writer & Artist: Simone Lia
Opus
Release: November 23 by The Washington Post Company. Writer: Berkeley Breathed Artist: Berkeley Breathed.

xxxHolic
Release: February 24 by Kodansha. Authors: Clamp.

Notes